Brian Keith O'Nora (born February 7, 1963) is an American umpire in Major League Baseball (MLB).

Umpiring career
O'Nora previously worked the Appalachian League (1985), the Midwest League (1986–1987), the Eastern League (1988–1989), the Pacific Coast League (1990), the American Association (1991), the International League, the Florida Instructional League (1985–1989) and the Puerto Rican Winter League (1990–1992).

Since joining the Major League umpiring staff in 2000, O'Nora has worked the 2004 National League Division Series, the 2006 National League Division Series, the 2009 National League Division Series, the 2010 American League Division Series, and the 2012 National League Division Series. He also umpired the 2008 American League Championship Series and the 2012 World Series. He was a part of the crew that worked in the 2000, 2010, and 2019 Major League Baseball All-Star Games.

Injuries
On June 24, 2008, during a game between the Colorado Rockies and the Kansas City Royals, O'Nora was accidentally struck in the head by a fragment from Miguel Olivo's broken bat. O'Nora sustained a mild concussion and a laceration on his forehead, and he was hospitalized until the next day.

In April 2013, O'Nora suffered an intestinal tear and had to leave a game between the New York Mets and the Philadelphia Phillies. On September 1, 2013, O'Nora departed during another game, this time involving the Rockies and the Cincinnati Reds, because he was experiencing illness.

On September 7, 2018, O'Nora was struck in the mask by a foul ball while working the plate as the Boston Red Sox hosted the Houston Astros; he finished the half-inning and then left the game.

On June 15, 2019, O'Nora was struck in the groin by a foul ball while behind the plate during a game between the New York Mets and the St. Louis Cardinals. O'Nora remained in the game for a few more pitches and then left through the Mets dugout due to continued discomfort.

Notable games
On September 25, 2003, O'Nora was the plate umpire for Carlos Delgado's four-homer game.

In 2011, O'Nora was one of two MLB umpires (the other being Scott Barry) who were selected to officiate the MLB-All Stars Taiwan series; Barry and O'Nora were joined by two Taiwanese umpires for the games.

During Spring training in 2014, O'Nora served as the replay umpire for the first use of expanded replay in a Major League Baseball game. After Toronto Blue Jays manager John Gibbons elected to challenge a safe call made by first base umpire Fieldin Culbreth, O'Nora upheld the ruling following a video review that lasted 2 minutes and 34 seconds.

O’Nora was behind home plate for the Chicago Cubs combined no hitter against the Los Angeles Dodgers on June 24, 2021.

Personal life
O'Nora is married and has three children.

In December 2020, he was arrested and charged with solicitation and possessing criminal tools in connection with a human trafficking sting in Liberty Township, Ohio.

See also 

 List of Major League Baseball umpires

References

External links
Major league profile
Retrosheet

1963 births
Living people
Sportspeople from Youngstown, Ohio
Major League Baseball umpires
People from Austintown, Ohio